is a former Japanese football player.

Playing career
Ota was born in Tokyo on June 17, 1973. After graduating from Kokushikan University, he joined Japan Football League club Montedio Yamagata in 1996. He played many matches as right and left side back from first season. The club was promoted to J2 League from 1999. He could not play many matches from 2005 and retired end of 2006 season.

Club statistics

References

External links

montedio.or.jp

1973 births
Living people
Kokushikan University alumni
Association football people from Tokyo
Japanese footballers
J2 League players
Japan Football League (1992–1998) players
Montedio Yamagata players
Association football defenders